Khuan Kalong is a district (amphoe) of Satun province, southern Thailand.

History
The minor district (king amphoe) Khuan Kalong was established on 1 June 1969 by splitting the three tambons Thung Nui, Pae-ra, and Tha Phae from Mueang Satun district. It was upgraded to a full district on 8 September 1976. On 1 June 1976 the two southwestern tambons of the district were split off to form Tha Phae Minor district. In 1996 the northwestern part was split off to form Manang district

Geography
Neighboring districts are (from the north clockwise) Palian of Trang province; Pa Bon of Phatthalung province; Rattaphum, Hat Yai, Khlong Hoi Khong and Sadao of Songkhla province; and Khuan Don, Tha Phae, La-ngu and Manang of Satun Province.

Administration
The district is divided into three sub-districts (tambons), which are further subdivided into 31 villages (muban). There are no municipal (thesaban) areas, and three tambon administrative organizations (TAO).

References

External links
amphoe.com
satunweb.net

Districts of Satun province